Mother Nature is a Cambodian environmental activist group and former non-governmental organization. The group was founded by Spanish activist Alejandro Gonzalez-Davidson in 2013. The group successfully campaigned and protested to overturn a planned hydropower dam in the Areng Valley in 2014. They have also protested against sand mining and deforestation in Cambodia. The group's advocacy and criticism of the Cambodian government has led to the prosecution and imprisonment of several of its members and Mother Nature having its official NGO status revoked by the Ministry of Interior in 2017.

Gonzalez-Davidson was expelled from the country and sentenced to 20 months in jail in 2015 in absentia. Although he was acquitted in 2019, several Cambodian activists were convicted and imprisoned. A Mother Nature activist was imprisoned in early 2021 for "incitement" for a one-woman protest against the filling of a lake in Phnom Penh. Three activists were arrested charged in June 2021 for various crimes including insulting the King, in a move that was criticised by international human rights groups and the embassies of the United States and Sweden.

References

External links 

 Official website

Non-profit organisations based in Cambodia
Radical environmentalism
Environmental organisations based in Cambodia
Environmental protests
Environmentalism in Cambodia
Cambodian activists
2013 establishments in Cambodia
Direct action